Haysom is a surname. Notable people with the surname include:

Elizabeth Haysom (born 1964), American murderer
Mark Haysom (born 1953), British businessman
Nicholas Haysom (born 1952), South African lawyer and diplomat
Wally Haysom (1897–1982), Australian rules footballer